Rodelas is a municipality in the state of Bahia in the North-East region of Brazil.

Geography
The municipality contains part of the  Raso da Catarina Ecological Station, created in 2001.
The municipality was designated a priority area for conservation and sustainable use when the Caatinga Ecological Corridor was created in 2006.

History
The unattested indigenous language Peria (also spelled Poria) was formerly spoken in Rodelas. The extinct Tuxá language was also spoken in Rodelas.

See also
List of municipalities in Bahia

References

Municipalities in Bahia